Spinor condensates are degenerate Bose gases that have degrees of freedom arising from the internal spin of the constituent particles 
.
They are described by a multi-component (spinor) order parameter.
Since their initial experimental realisation,
a wealth of studies have appeared, both
experimental and theoretical, focusing
on the physical properties of spinor condensates, including their 
ground states,  non-equilibrium dynamics, and
vortices.

Early work

The study of spinor condensates was initiated in 1998 by experimental groups at JILA 
and MIT.  These experiments utilised
23Na and 87Rb atoms, respectively.
In contrast to most prior experiments on ultracold gases, these experiments utilised a purely
optical trap, which is spin-insensitive.  Shortly thereafter, theoretical work appeared

which described the possible mean-field phases of spin-one spinor condensates.

Underlying Hamiltonian

The Hamiltonian describing a spinor condensate is most frequently written using the language of 
second quantization.   Here the field operator

creates a boson in Zeeman level  at position .  These
operators satisfy bosonic commutation relations:

The free (non-interacting) part of the Hamiltonian is

where  denotes the mass of the constituent particles and 
  is an external potential.
For a spin-one spinor condensate, the interaction Hamiltonian is

In this expression, 

is the operator corresponding to the density, 

is the local spin operator (
is a vector composed of the spin-one matrices),
and :: denotes normal ordering.   The parameters 
can be expressed in terms of the s-wave scattering lengths of the constituent particles.
Higher spin versions of the
interaction Hamiltonian are slightly more involved, but 
can generally be expressed by using Clebsch–Gordan coefficients.

Mean-field phases

In Gross-Pitaevskii mean field theory, one replaces the field operators with c-number functions:
.  To find the mean-field
ground states, one then minimises the resulting energy with respect to these c-number functions.
For a spatially uniform system spin-one system, there are two possible mean-field ground states.  
When , the ground state is

while for  the ground state is 

The former expression is referred to as the polar state while the latter is the 
ferromagnetic state.
Both states are unique up to overall spin rotations.  Importantly, 
cannot be rotated into .
The Majorana stellar representation 
 provides a particularly insightful description of the mean-field phases of spinor 
condensates with larger spin.

Vortices

Due to being described by a multi-component order parameter, numerous types of
topological defects (vortices) can appear in spinor condensates
.
Homotopy theory provides a natural description of  topological defects,  and is regularly employed to understand
vortices in spinor condensates.

References

Bose–Einstein condensates
Exotic matter
Phases of matter